The Damon Runyon Stakes is an American Thoroughbred horse race operated by the New York Racing Association (NYRA) at its Aqueduct Racetrack in South Ozone Park, Queens. First run in 1979, the annual event is currently contested on dirt over a distance of 7 furlongs. Restricted to horses bred in New York State, it was usually run in the late fall or early winter and open for two-year-olds only until 2020. With no race in 2019, those two-year-olds who turned three in 2020 competed when it was run on March 15.

One of a series of NYRA races for New York-bred horses, it is an important part of maintaining the significant breeding industry in that state.

The race is named for Damon Runyon, a famous sports reporter and short story writer who created a Broadway all his own during the Twenties and Thirties. From these stories came the musical Guys and Dolls. Runyon loved horse racing and campaigned a small string of his own horses.

Historical notes
The Damon Runyon Stakes was raced on the turf course in 1990, 1991 and 1993. It was hosted by the NYRA's Belmont Park in 1979 and again in 1983-84.

The Inaugural running of the Damon Runyon took place at Belmont Park on October 15, 1979. The feature race of the day, it was won by the Assunta Louis Farm's colt Restrainor under jockey Ruben Hernandez.

Leo O'Brien won this race three times but his 1990 win would come with the best horse he would ever train, Fourstars Allstar. The following year the horse made history when owner Richard Bomze and his Irish-born trainer took the colt to Ireland where he won the May 18, 1991 Irish 2000 Guineas. Although a number of horses bred in the United States and owned by Americans had won top level races in Europe, no horse trained in the United States had ever won a European classic race.

Records
Speed record:
 1:22.40 @ 7 furlongs: Notebook (1987)
 1:42.78 @ 1 mile, 70 yards: Ibboye (2009)

Most wins by a jockey:
 4 - Mike E. Smith (1990, 1992, 1993, 2006)
 4 - Aaron Gryder (1998, 2000, 2002, 2015)

Most wins by a trainer:
 3 - Leo O'Brien (1990, 1993, 1994)
 3 - Gary Contessa (1997, 2002, 2015)
 3 - Rudy R. Rodriguez (2014, 2018, 2020)

Most wins by an owner:
 2 - Assunta Louis Farm  (1979, 1980)
 2 - Alfred G. Vanderbilt Jr. (1992, 1998)
 2 - Michael Dubb (2014, 2021)

Winners

References

Horse races in New York (state)
Turf races in the United States
Recurring sporting events established in 1979
1979 establishments in New York City
Restricted stakes races in the United States